Oriental pickling melon, called wolgwa in Korean, and shirouri in Japanese, is a group of nonsweet melon cultivars used in Asian cuisines.

Use 

The melon is used as a vegetable in Asian cuisines.

Japan 
In Japan, the melon is used in narazuke, a type of tsukemono.

Korea 
In Korea, the melon is used as the main ingredient in wolgwa-chae, a type of japchae.

See also 
 Aehobak

References 

Fruit vegetables
Japanese vegetables
Korean vegetables